Jimmy Brady (1901 – 21 February 1976) was an Irish water polo player. He competed in the men's tournament at the 1924 Summer Olympics.

References

External links
 

1901 births
1976 deaths
Irish male water polo players
Olympic water polo players of Ireland
Water polo players at the 1924 Summer Olympics
Place of birth missing